Gold Coast is a 1980 crime fiction novel by American author Elmore Leonard. It was published as a mass-market paperback original. The book was adapted by Harley Peyton as a 1997 television film, Elmore Leonard's Gold Coast, directed by Peter Weller, and starring David Caruso and Marg Helgenberger.

References

External links
 Trailer for "Elmore Leonard's Gold Coast" from The New York Times website
 

1980 American novels
American novels adapted into films
Novels by Elmore Leonard